"Injured in the Game of Love" is a song by American rock musician Donnie Iris, released in 1985 as the lead single from his fifth studio album No Muss...No Fuss. The song reached number 91 on the US Billboard Hot 100 chart and number 28 on the US Billboard Mainstream Rock chart.

Critical reception
On its release, Billboard described "Injured in the Game of Love" as "brash, raucous pop" and Iris as a "male counterpart to Joan Jett". Cash Box felt Iris "displays a definite mastery of the pop/rock/dance format" on the track. They noted his "powerful vocals" alongside the "particularly strong music tracks and production values". Praising the song as "a good, singable tune", they believed it should "garner him renewed attention".

Charts

References

External links
Lyrics
Video

Donnie Iris songs
1985 singles
Songs written by Mark Avsec
Songs written by Donnie Iris
1985 songs
MCA Records singles